Jebel Ali is a municipality in the emirate of Dubai within the United Arab Emirates.

Jebel Ali may also refer to:
 Jebel Ali International Airport or Al Maktoum International Airport
 Jebel Ali Seaplane Base
 UAE Exchange (Dubai Metro) or Jebel Ali station

See also
 Jebel Ali Free Zone
 Jebel Ali refinery
 Port of Jebel Ali